Mirante da Serra is a municipality located in the Brazilian state of Rondônia. Its population was 10,818 (2020) and its area is 1,192 km².

References

Municipalities in Rondônia